The Queen's Corgi is a 2019 English-language Belgian computer-animated comedy film produced by nWave Pictures. The film was directed by Ben Stassen and Vincent Kesteloot and written by John R. Smith and Rob Sprackling. Inspired by Queen Elizabeth II and her pet corgis, the story follows a corgi named Rex, who gets lost and tries to find his way home.

The film was theatrically released in Belgium on 3 April 2019. It was panned by critics such as The Independent, which stated the film was "deeply unpleasant and in no way suitable for children." The film grossed $31 million worldwide.

Plot
Rex is the Queen's favourite corgi and lives a life of luxury with three other corgi companions in Buckingham Palace. On a visit made by President Donald Trump with his wife Melania Trump and their own dog Mitzi, the Queen suggests that perhaps one of her own corgis might prove to be a suitable mate for Mitzi, who chooses Rex, who is not pleased at all at the prospect of becoming mates with Mitzi. After Rex evades her multiple times, Mitzi eventually chases him into the dining hall where he accidentally bites the president, deeply angering the Queen.

Rex, feeling ashamed of embarrassing the Queen, is consoled by Charlie, another of the Queen's corgis who is secretly jealous of Rex's position. Luring him outside the palace with the false promise that the Pope in the Vatican is looking for dogs, Charlie disposes Rex's collar and leads him to a stream with the intention of drowning him.

Rex is then saved by a man who takes him to a dog shelter. There, Rex's mannerisms at first alienate him from the other dogs, but after some time he soon makes friends and also falls in love with Wanda, a fellow inmate. Initially wary of Rex, she soon also develops feelings for him. This raises the ire of Tyson, a former fighting dog, who also has feelings for Wanda and runs the kennel. Rex eventually convinces the other dogs to join forces against Tyson and together they defeat him.

Alongside his new friends and Wanda, Rex returns to the palace; however, the guards do not recognise him and throw him out of the palace as Charlie has convinced the Queen that Rex was killed by foxes. Still, with the help of his friends, Rex sneaks inside the palace where everybody tries to prevent Charlie from becoming top dog. However, Charlie traps Rex and Wanda inside a room and sets it in fire. With help from Rex, Wanda escapes the fire and rallies her friends in time to save Rex from the burning rubble.

The Queen, alerted by the ruckus, is overjoyed when she finds Rex alive and well and is about to return the honour of being the Top Dog to him. However, Rex refuses as he values his love for Wanda more than his position of Top Dog. Thus, he leaves the position to Charlie, who, as a result of becoming Top Dog, is forced to marry Mitzi and move to America while Rex continues to live at the palace with his new friends.

Cast

Production
Belgian company nWave Pictures produced and animated the film, with the distribution company Charades acquiring worldwide rights to it.

The film cost around $20 million to make.

Music
Ramin Djawadi, who scored Ben Stassen's previous films, such as Robinson Crusoe, The House of Magic and Fly Me to the Moon, returned to score the film. This is the seventh collaboration between Stassen and Djawadi.

Release
This film was released on 3 April 2019 in France and Belgium. It was also released in 2020 in other countries around the world, including China, the United Kingdom, Latin America, the United States and Russia.

Reception
The film was panned by critics. Rotten Tomatoes gave it a rare  score based on 20 reviews, with an average rating of 3.6/10.

References

External links
 
 

2019 films
2019 computer-animated films
Animated films about dogs
Animated films set in London
Belgian animated films
Belgian children's films
Cultural depictions of Donald Trump
Cultural depictions of Elizabeth II
Films about Elizabeth II
Films directed by Ben Stassen
Films about pets
Films scored by Ramin Djawadi
Films set in palaces
2010s English-language films
Films set in London